Connor Arendell (born March 30, 1990) is an American professional golfer. Arendell has played on the Challenge Tour, European Tour, and Korn Ferry Tour.

Amateur career
Arendell was born in Cape Coral, Florida, he currently resides in Fort Myers, Florida. He played college golf at the University of Central Florida where he was first team All-Conference USA and member of three consecutive conference team championships for the Knights. In 2009, Connor qualified for and advanced to the final 16 of the U.S. Amateur at Southern Hills in Tulsa, Oklahoma where he lost, 2 and 1, to Peter Uihlein. In 2010, he once again advanced to the final 16 of the U.S. Amateur at Chambers Bay, University Place, Washington where he lost to Patrick Cantlay, 1 down.

Professional career
Arendell qualified for the European Tour by playing in all three stages of Q-School in late 2013, finishing T-8th. He also had conditional status on the Web.com Tour in 2014 after competing in qualifying school. He played on the European Tour and Challenge Tour from 2014 to 2016. His best finish was tied for second at the 2014 Le Vaudreuil Golf Challenge. Since 2018, he has played on the Korn Ferry Tour. In 2019, he qualified for and played in the 2019 U.S. Open at Pebble Beach. On March 1, 2020, Arendell won the Yuengling Open at the Fort Myers Country Club in a playoff with a birdie on the second hole.

Professional wins
2021 Florida Open

See also
2013 European Tour Qualifying School graduates

References

External links

American male golfers
UCF Knights men's golfers
European Tour golfers
Golfers from Florida
People from Cape Coral, Florida
Sportspeople from Fort Myers, Florida
1990 births
Living people